Rainbow Arts Software GmbH was a German video game publisher based in Gütersloh. The company was founded in 1984 by Marc Ullrich and Thomas Meiertoberens and acquired by Rushware in 1986. The company's decline began in the early 1990s: The distributor did not manage to cover the costs of selling the titles worldwide, while development costs were constantly rising. The Rainbow Arts name lost its notoriety since then. The parent companies Rushware and Softgold were in turn bought up by the American games manufacturer THQ in 1999. In 1999, Funsoft Holding, which acquired Rushware and sister company Softgold in 1992, sold Rushware to THQ, which was incorporated into THQ Deutschland, THQ's German operations arm. Rainbow Arts also led one of the first lawsuits in 1993 on the question whether competition exists between a software company and a bulletin board system of similar name ("Rainbow BBS") operated by a student, so that claims under trademark law are enforceable. This was confirmed by the Munich District Court.

In January 2022, Ziggurat Interactive acquired more than 80 titles from Rainbow Arts.

Games 
 3001 O'Connor's Fight
 Apprentice
 The Baby of Can Guru
 Bad Cat
 Black Gold
 Der Blaue Kristall
 Blockout (Amiga, Atari ST, MS-DOS)
 Bozuma
 Circus Attractions
 Claim to Power
 Conqueror
 The Curse of RA
 Day of the Pharaoh
 Danger Freak
 Denaris
 Down at the Trolls
 Earthworm Jim (MS-DOS) 
 Earthworm Jim 2 (MS-DOS)
 East vs. West: Berlin 1948
 Future Tank
 Flies: Attack on Earth
 Garrison
 Garrison II: The Legend Continues
 Graffiti Man
 Grand Monster Slam
 The Great Giana Sisters
 Hard'n'Heavy
 Hurra Deutschland
 Imperium Romanum
 In 80 Days Around the World
 Jinks
 Katakis
 Khalaan
 Legend of Faerghail
 Logical
 Lollypop
 Mr. Pingo
 Money Molch
 M.U.D.S. – Mean Ugly Dirty Sport
 Mad TV
 Madness
 Masterblazer
 Mystery of the Mummy
 Nibbler (Amstrad CPC)
 Oxxonian
 Galactic Attack (Windows)
 Realm of the Trolls
 Rock'n Roll
 R-Type (Commodore 64)
 Rendering Ranger: R2
 Sarcophaser
 Shufflepuck Café (Amiga, MS-DOS)
 Sky Fighter
 Soldier
 Spaceball
 Spherical
 St. Thomas
 Starball
 StarTrash
 Street Cat
 Sunny Shine on the Funny Side of Life
 Thunder Boy
 To Be on Top
 Turrican
 Turrican II: The Final Fight
 Turrican 3: Payment Day
 Time
 Vision: The 5 Dimension Utopia
 Volleyball Simulator
 Warriors
 X-Out
 Z-Out

References

External links 
Rainbow Arts at MobyGames
Rainbow Arts the Hall of Light

German companies established in 1984
German companies disestablished in 1999
Defunct video game companies of Germany
THQ
Video game companies established in 1984
Video game companies disestablished in 1999
Video game development companies